The 1913 Chinese presidential election were the election held on 6 and 7 October 1913 in Beijing for the first formal President and Vice President of China. The incumbent Yuan Shikai and Li Yuanhong were elected by two houses of the National Assembly.

Results

President

Vice-President

See also
 History of Republic of China
 President of the Republic of China
 Vice President of the Republic of China
 1912 Chinese National Assembly election

Citations

References
 中央選舉委員會，中華民國選舉史，台北：中央選舉委員會印行，1987年

Presidential elections in the Republic of China (1912–1949)
1913 in China
China
Uncontested elections
October 1913 events